{{Automatic taxobox
| fossil_range = Cambrian, 
| taxon = Sachites
| authority = Meshkova, 1969
| type_species = Sachites longus
| type_species_authority = Qian, 1977
| subdivision_ranks = Species
| subdivision = 
S. alatus Duan, 1984
S. desquamatus Duan, 1984
S. folliformis Duan, 1984
S. longus Qian, 1977
S. maidipingensis Qian, 1977S. minus Qian et al., 1979S. terastios Qian et al., 1979
}}Sachites (Meshkova 1969) is an extinct genus of halkeriid that is only known from fossilised spiny sclerites; many Sachites specimens are now referred to as other halkieriid taxa. Although believed to be related to the halkieriids, a chancelloriid affinity has more recently been proposed.Sachites has seven species; the type species Sachites longus'' was named and described in 1977.

References

Fossil taxa described in 1969
Fossil taxa described in 1977
Extinct molluscs
Molluscs